Chowki Sukheke is a village of Hafizabad District on Sargodha road. It has population of approximately 4,500. It is near to the town Sukheke Mandi.

Tribes
Bhatti & Kharal are main tribes of this area. One of the renowned personality of this area is Haji Zulfiqar Ali Bhatti who has a big story of self-determination and hard work.

Villages in Hafizabad District
Hafizabad District